Blonde Ransom is a 1945 American comedy film directed by William Beaudine and starring Donald Cook, Virginia Grey, and Pinky Lee.

Plot

Cast
 Donald Cook as Duke Randall  
 Virginia Grey as Vicki Morrison 
 Pinky Lee as Pinky Lee  
 Collette Lyons as Sheila  
 George Barbier as Uncle William Morrison  
 Jerome Cowan as Ice Larson 
 George Meeker as Forbes  
 Ian Wolfe as Oliver  
 Joe Kirk as Bender  
 Charles Delaney as McDaily  
 Frank Reicher as Judge  
 William B. Davidson as Police Captain 
 Chester Clute as Clerk 
 Janina Frostova as Gypsy Dancer

References

Bibliography
 Marshall, Wendy L. William Beaudine: From Silents to Television. Scarecrow Press, 2005.

External links
 

1945 films
1945 comedy films
1940s English-language films
American comedy films
Films directed by William Beaudine
Universal Pictures films
American black-and-white films
1940s American films